Softball was an all-female punk band from Chiba, Japan. The band members — Moe (vocals/guitar), Nomiya (bass), and Rie (drums) — got together while still in high school. Mike Park signed them to Asian Man Records, and they released their first American album in 1999. In Japan, they were signed to Einstein Records.

They disbanded in March 2003. Later Moe formed a new, very similar-sounding all-female band, named Akiakane, also under Einstein Records.

Discography
Softball - 1999 on Asian Man
Tenku - 2000 on Asian Man

External links
Entry on Asian Man
[ Entry on Allmusic.com]
Einstein Records

All-female punk bands
Japanese punk rock groups
Asian Man Records artists
Musical groups from Chiba Prefecture